Ivison is a surname. Notable people with the surname include:

Billy Ivison (1920–2000), English footballer and rugby league player
John Ivison, Scottish-Canadian journalist and author
Robbie Ivison (born 2000), English footballer

See also
Evison